Ro-4, originally named Submarine No. 32, was an Imperial Japanese Navy Type F submarine of the F2 subclass. The Type F submarines were the first truly seagoing Japanese submarines, and the earliest to be classified as "second-class" or "medium" submarines of the Ro series. Ro-4 was commissioned in 1922 and operated in the waters of Chōsen and Japan. She was stricken in 1932.

Design and description
The Type F submarines were designed by the Italian firm Fiat-Laurenti and built under license by Kawasaki at Kobe, Japan. They were the Imperial Japanese Navy′s first true seagoing submarines, and when the Japanese adopted a three-tiered classification system of its submarines as first-class (I), second-class or medium (Ro), and third-class (Ha) on 1 November 1924, the Type F submarines were the earliest to receive the second-class classification, as reflected in their low numbers in the Ro series, and in fact they were the earliest Japanese submarine classified as anything higher than third-class. They had non-cylindrical hulls intended to provide extra internal space, but the Japanese considered the hulls weak despite the provision of additional scantlings during construction to reinforce them. 

The submarines of the F2 subclass displaced  surfaced and  submerged. For surface running, the submarines were powered by two  Fiat diesel engines, each driving one propeller shaft. When submerged each propeller was driven by a Savigliano  electric motor. They could reach  on the surface and  underwater.

The submarines were armed with five  torpedo tubes, three in the bow and two in the stern, and carried a total of eight Type 44 torpedoes. As built, they were armed with a 7.7 mm machine gun. Soon after completion, however, a  deck gun was added.

Because of their disappointing performance, the Type F submarines did not serve as the basis for any later Japanese submarine classes.

Construction and commissioning

Ordered in 1918, Ro-4 was laid down as Submarine No. 32 on 22 December 1919 by Kawasaki at Kobe, Japan. Launched on 22 June 1921, she was completed and commissioned on 5 May 1922.

Service history

Upon commissioning, Submarine No. 32 was attached to the Sasebo Naval District. She was assigned to Submarine Division 23 on 8 May 1922. On 1 December 1922, Submarine Division 23 was assigned to the Chinkai Defense Division on the southern coast of Chōsen. Submarine No. 32 was renamed Ro-4 on 1 November 1924.

Submarine Division 23 was reassigned to the Sasebo Defense Division in the Sasebo Naval District on 1 December 1924. On 1 June 1925, the division was assigned to the 1st Fleet, and on 1 December 1925 it returned to the Sasebo Defense Division in the Sasebo Naval District, where it remained for the rest of Ro-4′s active service.

Ro-4 was stricken from the Navy list on 1 April 1932. She was renamed Hulk No. 3020 and served as a stationary hulk through the end of World War II on 15 August 1945.

Notes

Bibliography
 Gray, Randal, ed., Conway′s All the World′s Fighting Ships 1906–1921, Annapolis, Maryland: Naval Institute Press, 1985, .

Ro-3-class submarines
Type F submarines
Ships built by Kawasaki Heavy Industries
1921 ships